Janet Lee and Wynne Prakusya were the defending champions, but lost in the first round to Jelena Dokic and Tamarine Tanasugarn.

Lisa Raymond and Rennae Stubbs won the title by defeating Janette Husárová and Conchita Martínez 6–1, 6–1 in the final.

Seeds

Draw

Draw

References

External links
 Official results archive (ITF)
 Official results archive (WTA)

Bank of the West Classic - Doubles
Silicon Valley Classic